Oy Stenfors Ab is a Finnish building automation company based in Oulu, Finland. Company has also a branch office in Helsinki. Mainly the company manufactures and installs HVAC control systems for large buildings such as schools, industry buildings and offices. Oy Stenfors Ab is regarded as the oldest Finnish building automation company.

History
Company was founded by Sulevi Stenfors in September 1969 as a sole trader. Business carried the name Technical office S. Stenfors.

Present
Oy Stenfors AB's current CEO is Tero Sundquist and the Chairman Sebastian Stenfors.

References

External links
 http://www.stenfors.fi

Engineering companies of Finland